Ribella is a champion horse race (mare) born in Ireland. She raced in Turkey. She has won the greatest races in Turkey and is considered one of the most popular horses in the country.

Achievements

2001 
A Maiden 1st
Handicap 15 1st
Joe Clarke (L)2nd
Piri Reis (L) 3rd

2002 
Efes (L) 2nd
Cantatrice(L) 1st
Ayizi (L) 1st
Fehmi Simsaroglu (G3) 1st
Filly Trial (G1) 2nd
Mare Trial (G1) 1st
Anafartalar (G2) 2nd

2003 
Listed 4th

2004 
Listed 3rd
Fikret Yüzatli (G3) 4th
Ethem Menderes (G3) 2nd
İsmet İnonu (G1) 1st
Zübeyde Hanım (G2) 1st
Prime Ministry Cup (G1) 4th
Fatih Sultan Mehmet (G1) 5th
Topkapı Trophy (G2) 3rd
G3 3rd
International Anatolia Cup (G2) 1st
Vehbi Koc (G3) 1st
Fetih (G3) 2nd

2005 
Dubai Daad al Shaba 1 Cuped Trial 1st
Zubeyde Hanim (G2) 1st
International Adnan Menderes Cup (G2) 3rd
Prime Ministry Cup (G1) 1st
Fatih Sultan Mehmet (G1) 1st
Topkapı Trophy (G2) 4th
TJK Cup (G1) 2nd
Fevzi Çakmak (G2) 2nd
International Anatolia Cup (G2) 1st

2006 
IBB Cup (G3)2nd
Ismet Inonu (G2)2nd
Zubeyde Hanım (G2) 1st
Adnan Menderes (G2) 2nd
International Topkapi Trophy (G2) 1st with a massed sprint. She was 200 m back from the 1st. Last 100 m she sprinted and won on the photo.
Marmara Trophy (G3)1st
International Anatolia Cup (G2) 1st
Atıf Esenbel (G3) 1st

2007 
Ismet Inonu Cup (G2) 1st
Zubeyde Hanim Cup (G2) 2nd
Prime Ministry Cup (G1) 3rd
Topkapı Trophy (G1)2nd
Orhan Doga Ozsoy Cup(G3) 1st
International Anatolia Cup (G2)1st

2008 
Şadi Eliyeşil(L)1st
Zubeyde Hanım Cup (G2)1st
Prime Ministry Cup (G1)4th

References 

1999 racehorse births
Racehorses bred in Ireland
Racehorses trained in Turkey
Thoroughbred family 1-l